Beldham is a surname. Notable people with this surname include:

 Billy Beldham (1766–1862), English cricket player
 George Beldham (born 1758), English cricket player, brother of Billy
 John Beldham (fl. 1790s), English cricket player